Edward Lawrence Logan (1875–1939) was a U.S. Army major general. General Logan may also refer to:

Arthur J. Logan (fl. 1980s–2020s), U.S. Army major general
John A. Logan (1826–1886), Union Army major general
Thomas M. Logan (1840–1914), Confederate States Army brigadier general